Stagecoach Cumbria & North Lancashire operates both local and regional bus services in Cumbria, Lancashire, Northumberland and Tyne and Wear, England, as well as Dumfries and Galloway, Scotland. It is a subsidiary of the Stagecoach Group, which operates bus, coach, rail and tram services across the United Kingdom.

History 
The company has its origins in the purchase of Cumberland Motor Services and Ribble Motor Services from the National Bus Company in the late 1980s. 

The company's head office is based in Carlisle. It was previously known as Stagecoach North West until 1 September 2011, when Stagecoach Merseyside amalgamated with Chorley and Preston depots to form Stagecoach Merseyside & South Lancashire.

Overview
Stagecoach Cumbria & North Lancashire predominantly operates commercial bus services in Cumbria and Lancashire, with some services extending into Dumfries and Galloway (79 & 179), as well as Northumberland and Tyne and Wear (685). The company also operate several contracted services on behalf of Cumbria County Council and Lancashire County Council.

Stagecoach in Cumbria 
Stagecoach in Cumbria is the trading name of Stagecoach North West Limited, and predominantly operates services in Cumbria. The company has been formerly known as Barrow Borough Transport, Stagecoach Cumberland and Stagecoach Ribble.

Cumberland Motor Services was one of the first National Bus Company subsidiaries to be privatised: this was almost immediately after gaining the Penrith and Carlisle depots from Ribble. The company was bought from the NBC by Stagecoach, who split it into two territories: CMS Carlislebus for services within Carlisle itself and CMS Cumberland for the rest of the services; eventually both territories merged with Ribble's south Cumbria services to become Stagecoach Cumberland.

In 2005, the company commenced operation of Cumbria County Council-secured service X35, which ran between Barrow-in-Furness and Kendal via Ulverston and Grange-over-Sands. In July 2012, funding was withdrawn and the service was taken over commercially by Stagecoach C&NL. At the same time, the service was renumbered X6 and the route was diverted away from Westmorland General Hospital.

In July 2016, a fleet of twelve Alexander Dennis Enviro 400 MMC double-deck vehicles were introduced on service 555, which runs between Keswick and Lancaster via Grasmere – an investment totalling £2.5 million.

In July 2017, a fleet of open-top Alexander ALX400 were replaced by new Volvo B5TL/Wright Gemini 3. Branded in the two-tone green LAKEsider livery, the vehicles operate on service 599 between Bowness-on-Windermere and Grasmere via Ambleside.

The company has been frequently criticised for charging high fares – especially when the cost of a single journey is equated against a comparative journey in London.

Stagecoach in Lancaster 
Stagecoach in Lancaster operates services in and around the towns of Lancaster and Morecambe. It is the trading name of Stagecoach North West Limited, and consists of the former Stagecoach Ribble services, as well as those formerly operated by Lancaster City Transport – a municipal bus operator which ceased trading in 1993.

Fleet and operations

Depots
As of April 2022, the company operates from five bus depots across the region: Barrow-in-Furness, Carlisle, Kendal, Morecambe and Workington, as well as two outstations: Catterall and Penrith. An outstation at Ingleton was closed in 2022, following the withdrawal of services 80 and 81.

Vehicles
The fleet consists mainly of diesel-powered single and double-deck buses manufactured by Alexander Dennis, Optare, Volvo and Wrightbus. Some double-deck vehicles are open-top, including a fleet of Wright StreetDeck, which operate within the Lake District National Park.

Branding

As of May 2022, vehicles in the fleet are in the process of being rebranded into the new fleet livery, which was revealed in January 2020. It consists of a white base with blue, green and orange swirls, featuring the company's updated logo. The former livery was introduced over 20 years prior, and consisted of vehicles painted in a white base, with a blue skirt, and red and orange swoops. Dedicated route brands include Lakes Connection (555) and LAKEsider (599).

Notes

References

Sources

External links
 
 Stagecoach (North West) Limited on Companies House
 Stagecoach Cumbria & North Lancashire website

Stagecoach Group bus operators in England
Employee-owned companies of the United Kingdom
Bus operators in Cumbria
Bus operators in Lancashire
Transport in Barrow-in-Furness